Vail is a home rule municipality in Eagle County, Colorado, United States. The population of the town was 4,835 in 2020. Home to Vail Ski Resort, the largest ski mountain in Colorado, the town is known for its hotels, dining, and for the numerous events the city hosts annually, such as the Vail Film Festival, Vail Resorts Snow Days, and Bravo! Vail.

History

Vail was incorporated in 1966, four years after the opening of Vail Ski Resort. The ski area was founded by Pete Seibert and local rancher Earl Eaton in 1962, at the base of Vail Pass. The pass was named after Charles Vail, the highway engineer who routed U.S. Highway 6 through the Eagle Valley in 1940, which eventually became Interstate 70. Seibert, a New England native, served in the U.S. Army's 10th Mountain Division during World War II, which trained at Camp Hale, 14 miles south of Vail between Red Cliff and Leadville. He was wounded in Italy at the Battle of Riva Ridge but went on to become a professional skier after he recovered.

Seibert, with other former members of the 10th Mountain Division, returned to Colorado after World War II with the intention of opening a ski resort. During training for ski troopers at Camp Hale, he bivouacked on Vail Mountain and identified it as an ideal ski mountain. In the early 1960s, Seibert got funds from a group of Colorado investors, including Jack Tweedy, and with Earl Eaton bought a ranch at the base of the mountain and eventually incorporated as Vail Associates. As plans continued for a new ski resort, Seibert hired Morrie Shepard as Vail's first ski school director. Shortly after, Shepard recruited Rod Slifer from Aspen to be the assistant ski school director. Slifer also became the only real estate broker in the early years of Vail and would later be the broker in the transaction that allowed Vail to buy a ranch, now known as the world-famous Beaver Creek.

In December 1962, Vail officially opened for its first season. It operated a gondola lift and two ski lifts on the mountain owned by the United States Forest Service. The village was established at the base of the mountain for local residents and offered lodging for visitors. It quickly grew throughout the valley, with housing added first in East Vail and then West Vail, and additional lodging added in Lionshead in the late 1960s.

Within the first year, the village had a ski shop operated by Dick Hauserman and Joe Langmaid, a ski boutique operated by Blanche Hauserman and Bunny Langmaid, a hotel and restaurant operated by Pepi Gramshammer, and the mountain had a manager. By 1969, Vail was the most popular ski resort in the state. In 1988 Vail opened China Bowl, making Vail the third largest ski area in North America.

Geography

Gore Creek flows from east to west through the center of town.

The town is surrounded by the White River National Forest and the Vail Ski Resort is leased from the United States Forest Service. Mount of the Holy Cross is visible from Vail Mountain.

Vail Mountain

It has a  skiable area, 33 ski lifts, 193 marked skiing trails on three faces: the front side, the back bowls, and Blue Sky Basin. The seven back bowls are Sun Down Bowl, Sun Up Bowl, Teacup Bowl, China Bowl, Siberia Bowl, Inner Mongolia Bowl, and Outer Mongolia Bowl. Blue Sky Basin includes Pete's Bowl and Earl's Bowl—to commemorate Pete Seibert and Earl Eaton. The mountain resort also includes 17 miles of recreation paths, botanical gardens, and an outdoor amphitheater.

Climate
Vail has warm summers and cold winters because of its elevation. Minimum temperatures mostly remain below the freezing point from late September to late May. Roads may close occasionally during heavy snowfall. Summer temperatures can reach the 80s, but are more often in the mid to high 70s. Combined with mountain breezes, this makes summers refreshing and cool. For being a borderline subarctic climate daytime temperatures are very mild, indicating high diurnal temperature variation due to the altitude.

Demographics

The 2000 census found 4,531 people, 2,165 households, and 762 families living in the town. The racial makeup of the town was 94.13% White, 0.29% African American, 0.49% Native American, 1.66% Asian, 0.09% Pacific Islander, 1.43% from other races, and 1.92% from two or more races. Hispanic or Latino people of any race were 6.20% of the population.

There were 2,165 households in which 11.8% had children under the age of 18, 30.0% were married couples, 3.0% had a female householder with no husband present, and 64.8% were non-families. 33.2% of all households were made up of individuals, and 2.7% had someone living alone who was 65 years of age or older. The average household size was 2.09 people and the average family size was 2.62 people.

The population age distribution was 9.9% people under the age of 18, 14.8% from 18 to 24, 47.9% from 25 to 44, 22.6% from 45 to 64, and 4.7% who were 65 years of age or older. The median age was 32 years. There were 140.1 males for every 100 females, and 143.0 males for every 100 females age 18 and over.

The median household income was $56,680, and the median family income was $66,389. Men had a median income of $33,534 versus $32,065 for women. The per capita income for the town was $42,390. About 1.8% of families and 6.6% of the population were below the poverty line, including 0.9% of those under age 18 and 7.2% of those aged 65 or over.

Economy
The Vail economy relies heavily on tourism. The main attraction in Vail is winter sports such as skiing and snowboarding on the mountain, in addition to snowmobiling and snowshoeing, among many other winter sports. Vail is also a summer resort and golfing center. Summer activities include guided hikes, mountain biking, horseback riding, carriage rides and fishing. Vail is also developing as a cultural center, with various art and music venues active throughout the summer. The town has a developed culinary center, with a variety of restaurants.

A Vail Resorts spokesperson said in 2022 that there is a deficit of some 6,000 beds for the county's work force.

Culture

Notable events
 Bravo! Vail – featuring the New York Philharmonic Orchestra, The Philadelphia Orchestra, and the Dallas Symphony Orchestra
 Vail Film Festival – in March or early April, annually
 Vail International Dance Festival – summer dance festival featuring major ballet and contemporary dance companies. Notable companies include the New York City Ballet, the Paul Taylor Dance Company, and the San Francisco Ballet.
 Vail Lacrosse Shootout – Late June-Early July Ford Park.
 Vail Summer Bluegrass Series – Free, 4-week long bluegrass concert series in Lionshead Village; end of June – July
 Taste of Vail, First week of April: The iconic food and wine event of Vail
Burton US Open Snowboarding Championships
Vail Resorts Snow Days
GoPro Mountain Games

Museums and institutions 
 Betty Ford Alpine Gardens
 Colorado Ski Museum
 The Steadman Clinic & Steadman Philippon Research Institute – sports medicine clinic and research center for orthopedic injuries
 Vail Health Hospital
 Vail Ski Resort
 Vail Nature Center

Government
Charles "Ted" Kindel was the first mayor of Vail, elected when it became a town on Aug. 3, 1966.

Vail has a council-manager form of government and is led by a seven-member town council elected at-large. The current mayor is Kim Langmaid, whose seat will be vacated following the 2023 town council election due to term limits.

Flag 
The flag of Vail is flown by government buildings and businesses in Vail. It is composed of three stripes which are light blue, white, and dark green, which represent the blue Colorado sky, white powder snow, and the surrounding Evergreen forest, respectively. Centered on the flag is the original Vail element, which consists of two "V"s, the upper to represent the surrounding mountains, while the lower represents the Vail Valley. A gold wreath surrounds the element to represent excellence and achievement.

Education
Vail's public schools are part of Eagle County School District RE-50, with high school students attending the nearby Battle Mountain High School in Edwards. Eagle County Schools also offers the Vail Ski & Snowboard Academy, a joint program with area ski programs for students in grades 5–12 who are involved in competitive skiing and snowboarding. Private schools in the Vail area include Vail Mountain School (K-12), Vail Christian High School (9–12), St. Clare of Assisi Catholic School (K-8), and the Vail Academy (PK-8). Higher education is available at the Vail Eagle Valley campus of Colorado Mountain College.

Media
The Vail Daily newspaper is published by Swift Communications.

A broadcast translator for public radio station KUNC allows listeners in the Eagle Valley to listen at 99.7 FM.

Two specialty television networks have stations in Vail, Plum TV and Resort Sports Network. The latter, branded as TV-8, also broadcasts on the low-powered UHF station K34QB-D. The Ski Channel is available only on DirecTV on Channel 1860.

During the mid-1970s, Vail became known as the Western White House of President Gerald Ford, when he conducted much of the nation's business from The Lodge at Vail hotel. The national media followed Ford to Vail and often broadcast television pictures of Vail's mountain slopes.

Transportation

Vail is served by Eagle County Airport near Gypsum,  to the west. Native Americans used to call the area near the airport the "hole in the sky" because storms seemed to avoid it. Vail is modeled on European ski towns, many of which are car-free, and the town is partially pedestrianized. The town operates the largest free shuttle bus system in the United States and has ten hybrid-electric buses. At each bus stop, a sign reports when the next two buses will arrive.

The In-Town Shuttle provides service every five minutes during peak winter times, and every 15 minutes off-peak, between Golden Peak, Vail Village, the business district, and Lionshead, with live schedule information provided at bus stops by Global Positioning System technology, which tracks buses. Other routes centering on the Transportation Center service the East and West Vail districts on a scheduled, but less frequent basis.

Eagle County provides bus service from the Transportation Center with service to Vail, Leadville, Minturn, Eagle-Vail, Avon, Beaver Creek, Edwards, Eagle, Gypsum and Dotsero.

The Colorado Department of Transportation, through its Bustang program, provides intercity transportation to Vail along its West Line. The West Line goes from Denver to Grand Junction and back.

Highways
Interstate 70 runs east–west through the middle of Vail and is the only road to or from Vail, with exits at East Vail, at the base of Vail Pass, the town of Vail, and West Vail. To the west, it meets U.S. Highway 24 at Dowd Junction, passes through Avon, Edwards, Colorado, and Eagle, through Glenwood Canyon traveling and on to Grand Junction, and reaches Utah, where it ends at the intersection with Interstate 15.

In West Vail, U.S. Route 6 (which still exists as a service road between East Vail, Vail, and West Vail) merges with I-70 at Dowd Junction. I-70 roughly follows the original Highway 6 route until the two highways diverge again in Silverthorne,  to the east.

Notable people

 Joanna Cameron, actress
 Toby Dawson, Olympic skier
 Rob Eaton, musician
 Laurence D. Fink, businessman
 Betty Ford, Former First Lady of the United States (1974–1977)
 Gerald Ford, Former President of the United States (1974–1977)
 John Glenn, astronaut and politician
 James Hetfield, musician
 Buddy Lazier, auto racing driver
 Flinn Lazier, auto racing driver and skier
 Brad Ludden, kayaker
 Seth Morrison, skier
 Sarah Schleper, Olympic skier
 Mikaela Shiffrin, Olympic skier
 Richard Steadman, surgeon
 Oscar Tang, financier
 Katie Uhlaender, Olympic skeleton racer
 Lindsey Vonn, Olympic skier

In popular culture 

 Vail is mentioned in episode 9 of season 1 in the TV show Friends, as the place Rachel Green could not afford a ticket to go ski with her family.
 Vail, Colorado is referenced in the Stephen Adly-Guirgis play Den of Thieves as the place Paul would like to go to for a "Holistic wellness retreat".
 The Kardashian sisters filmed in Vail, Colorado for their TV show Keeping Up with the Kardashians in 2016. Khloé Kardashian, Kendall, and Kylie Jenner skied and snowboarded down the mountain while exploring Vail's Vail Village and Lionshead.
 A cable car accident in Vail is shown in episode 8 of season 1 in the series Preacher.
 Vail is mentioned in the 2022 movie Luckiest Girl Alive in comparison with Aspen, when the main character (Mila Kunis) says, referring to her husband: "And [he] skis in Vail because Aspen is lousy with the noveau riche"

See also

Vail Lacrosse Shootout
Vail Pass
Vail Ski Resort

References

External links

 
 
 Vail Valley Partnership, Chamber of Commerce
 

Towns in Eagle County, Colorado
Towns in Colorado
1966 establishments in Colorado
Populated places established in 1966
Car-free zones in the United States